The Extresol Solar Power Station is a 150 megawatt (MW) commercial concentrated solar thermal power plant, located in Torre de Miguel Sesmero in the province of Badajoz, Extremadura, Spain.

The power station consists of three different systems, Extresol 1, Extresol 2 and Extresol 3, of 50 MW each, due to the power limitation of 50 MW per plant established by the Spanish legislation. Extresol uses parabolic trough and has a thermal energy storage system, which absorbs part of the heat produced in the solar field during the day and stores it in molten salts. Extresol 1 cost around €300 million and was inaugurated on 25 February 2009. The name of the power station, Extresol, is based on the name of the autonomous community, Extremadura, and the Spanish word for "Sun".

See also 

List of solar thermal power stations
List of energy storage projects
Renewable energy in the European Union
Sener Aeronáutica
Solar power in Spain
Solar thermal energy
Wind power in Spain

References 

Solar power stations in Spain
Solar thermal energy
Energy in Extremadura